Timothy John Chadwick (4 October 1962 – 17 March 2010) was a New Zealand artist, motoring enthusiast and author. His mixed media paintings have been exhibited at the Govett-Brewster Art Gallery, New Plymouth, the Manawatu Art Gallery in Palmerston North, and dealer galleries in Auckland and Wellington, as well as at the Lincoln Center, New York and in Australia and the United Kingdom. His paintings are held in the Massey University collection, the James Wallace collection of New Zealand art and several private collections in San Francisco, Melbourne, London and throughout New Zealand.

Chadwick had also had more than a dozen non-fiction books published, including Tractors in New Zealand and Saloon Motorsport in New Zealand. He turned to writing after suffering "artist's block", and his first books featured paintings of the cars they discussed. He also wrote for NZ Classic Car magazine, a local New Zealand newspaper and occasionally New Zealand Truck and Driver magazine. His artwork often had crossovers with his motoring writing, for example, a major series of work created in the late-1980s and early-1990s was painted on second hand car bonnets (hoods). A later work featured Abel Tasman, an Austin Tasman car and the now extinct thylacine (Tasmanian tiger).

Life
Chadwick was born in Hawera, South Taranaki in 1962.
In his formative art years Chadwick was taught by artists Cliff Whiting, Paul Dibble and Frank Davis.

In the early 1990s he led a group known as the Scarecrow Committee who unsuccessfully campaigned to prevent KFC from bulldozing the Hawera house of New Zealand author Ronald Hugh Morrieson and replacing it with a fast food outlet. This is detailed in Julia Millen's book, Ronald Hugh Morrieson: A Biography. In 2008 Chadwick set foot in the Hawera KFC outlet for the first time since the Morrieson house campaign of the early 1990s,at Hawera, to read a chapter from The Scarecrow by Ronald Hugh Morrieson as part of artist Liz Allens 'One Day Sculpture' art happening.

On the 9 September 2009 ( 09 09 09 )Tim Chadwick released his own CAL postage stamp through New Zealand Post Ltd, a stamp known as the 'Pink Beetle Post' stamp, featuring a pink Volkswagen Beetle car. Only 1000 stamps were ordered and printed. Some were used on Chadwick's official First Day Cover ( FDC) which featured his caricature of pink beetle insects and a pink Beetle car.
Three months later he came up with "Orange Lambretta Post" with a 50¢ stamp (CAL) illustrating the Lambretta motor scooter, and issued 100 FDC's. These rarely appear & are highly sought after.

Chadwick had two children and lived in New Plymouth. He taught art at Inglewood High School in Taranaki. He was killed on 17 March 2010 when his car failed to take a bend on State Highway 3 near Piopio.

Bibliography
 The Kiwi Truckers guide to life  HarperCollins, 2009
 Zephyrs and Zodiacs - A Kiwi Passion   HarperCollins 2009
 Ford - A Kiwi Passion   HarperCollins 2008
 Holden - A Kiwi Passion     HarperCollins, 2008
 Diggers, Dumpers and Dozers - Big Machines In New Zealand    Grantham House, 2008
 Motorcycles In New Zealand    Grantham House, 2006
 Saloon Motorsport in New Zealand  Grantham House, 2004
Trucks New Zealand – Historics, Haulers & Heavies  Grantham House, 2004
 Big Cars in New Zealand - English, European, American, Australian and Japanese  Grantham House, 2002
Utes & Pick-Ups in New Zealand  Grantham House, 2002
Small Cars in New Zealand – Baby Austins, Ford Prefects, Minis, VWs & More!  Grantham House, 2001
Trucking Along – A Pictorial History of Trucks in New Zealand  Grantham House, 2001
Saloon Car Racing in New Zealand - The Classic Years  Grantham House, 1999

References

External links
 Chadwick's work at Virtual TArt gallery

1962 births
2010 deaths
People from Hāwera
20th-century New Zealand non-fiction writers
21st-century New Zealand non-fiction writers
20th-century New Zealand male writers
21st-century New Zealand male writers
20th-century New Zealand male artists
21st-century New Zealand male artists
20th-century New Zealand painters
21st-century New Zealand painters
Road incident deaths in New Zealand